Albertano contra los mostros is a Mexican sitcom television series produced by André Barrén for TelevisaUnivision. It premiered first in the United States on Univision on 3 April 2022. Ariel Miramontes stars as Albertano, the title character. Production of the series began on 29 October 2021. In Mexico, the series premiered on Las Estrellas on 17 April 2022.

Plot 
The series follows Albertano (Ariel Miramontes) and his fight against businesswoman Lola D'Bo (Maribel Guardia) and the witch Casilda (Olivia Collins). Casilda pursues Albertano in order to devour his heart in a ritual that will allow her to be eternally young and beautiful. Lola D'Bo seeks to join Casilda to obtain the secret of eternal youth.

Cast 
 Ariel Miramontes as Albertano Santa Cruz
 Benito Castro as Father Benito
 Paola Fernández as Encarnita
 José Luis Guarneros as El Macaco
 Montserrat Marañón as Catita
 Sergio Lozano as Dónovan
 Rebeca Duvignau as Beyoncé
 Mariano Soria as Chinicuil
 Olivia Collins as Casilda
 Maribel Guardia as Lola D'Bo

Episodes

References 

2022 Mexican television series debuts
Las Estrellas original programming
Mexican television sitcoms
Television series by Televisa
Spanish-language television shows